#Code is a Moroccan action web series created by Inwi that premiered on June 1 on their YouTube channel. It is meant as a promotional content for the mobile operator, and is the second effort at making a web series after a 2-seasons web series called Switchers.

The series was distributed through Inwi social accounts in Facebook and YouTube.

Plot 
Karim, an engineer in a company, was about to reveal information about his employers evildoings, when he is caught up in a traffic accident leading to his death. But Karim hasn't disappeared yet and has one chance to complete the mission he started.

Main cast and characters 
 Youssef Ben Hayoun Sadafi as Karim
 Ghita Lahmamsi as Sofia
 Youssef La Gazouille as El Wafi
 Hamid El Hadri as Driss
 Youssef Benzakour as Imad
 Jalilo Essaidi as Fouad
 Alex Bego as Igor
 Fati Jamali as Imane
 Ahmed Aznague as Police chef
 Rachida Manar as Mother of Sofia
 Hamid Ezzouek as Father of Sofia
 Hamza Idrissi as Doctor
 Maha El Boukhari as Sarah

Episodes 
The web series was scheduled to run during the month of Ramadan, the YouTube views were updated :

Production 
Inwi first effort at making a web series was a similar concept called Switchers, which ran for 2 seasons.

#Code was shot in several places around Casablanca in the course of 2 weeks.

Marketing 
The series uses extensive references to Inwi's mobile and Internet offers, in addition to services like "Beddel Sawtek", "Semme3ni" and their mobile game "z7am".

Inwi also partnered with phone manufacturer Samsung, radio station Hit Radio, and production company SIGMA.

In episode 4, Karim is seen playing "Z7am" a traffic runner mobile game that was released by The Wall Games in partnership with Inwi.

References

External links 
 #Code YouTube channel
 Inwi website

2016 web series debuts